The Royal Windsor Wheel was a non-permanent transportable Ferris wheel installation at Alexandra Gardens, Windsor, Berkshire, England.

The Royal Windsor Wheel first operated in 2006. In 2009 it operated from April to October and carried over 200,000 passengers. During 2010, it opened daily from 10 am to 10 pm, from 1 May until 30 August.

In 2011, the official website stated that the 365 tonne wheel had 40 6-person gondolas, including one VIP gondola and one disabled access gondola, offering views from a height of 60 metres.

In July 2021 a new company (Roses pleasure parks limited) applied to the local council to build a smaller wheel near the original site

References

External links

Transportable Ferris wheels
Buildings and structures in Windsor, Berkshire